Solontsy is a rural locality (a selo) in Tarbagataysky District, Republic of Buryatia, Russia. The population was 642 as of 2010. There are 10 streets in the locality.

Geography 
Solontsy is located 17 km north of Tarbagatay (the district's administrative centre) by road. Selenga is the nearest rural locality.

References 

Rural localities in Tarbagataysky District